Ponchai Kamau Wilkerson (15 July 1971 – 14 March 2000) (also Ponchai Kamau, Kamau Wilkerson, Ponchai "Kamau" Wilkerson) was a convicted murderer executed by lethal injection by the U.S. state of Texas. He was convicted for the 28 November 1990 murder of jeweler Chung Myong Yi. He was convicted by a jury on 16 July 1991 and ten days later sentenced to death by the same jury.

Early life
Ponchai Kamau Wilkerson (โพนชัย กาเมา วิลเกอร์สัน), of African-American and Thai descent, was born in Houston, Texas. Not much is known about Wilkerson's early childhood; he later grew up in the Fort Bend-Houston area east of Missouri City, Texas, attending public schools in the Fort Bend Independent School District. Ponchai graduated from Willowridge High School in 1990.

Criminal activities
On 28 November 1990, Wilkerson and Wilton Bethony entered Yi Chung Myong's jewellery shop Royal Gold Jewellery Store in Houston, Texas. They had been on a crime spree for a month. Wilkerson left briefly twice, and pulled a Glock pistol from his jacket upon returning the second time and fired the gun once without warning at Yi Chung Myong's temple from a distance of 30 cm (12 inches). During the trial, Wilkerson testified that the murder was not committed in self-defense or accidentally.

The Texas Court of Criminal Appeals affirmed his conviction and sentence on 12 December 1994. He also appealed to the United States Court of Appeals for the Fifth Circuit and Supreme Court of the United States, who both denied his appeals.

During Thanksgiving Day, 1998, Wilkerson and six other death row inmates were involved in an attempted prison break. One inmate, Martin Gurule, managed to escape, but was shot and drowned soon afterwards. Wilkerson and the other six inmates involved all surrendered.

Wilkerson exhausted his final appeal to Judge Jan Krocker in February 2000, a dramatic scene involving community activist Njeri Shakur (member of the Texas Death Penalty Abolition Movement and the Allen Parkway Village Residents Council) shouting at Judge Krocker, which led to a contempt charge against Shakur; she served 30 days in the Harris County Jail.  Shakur and Deloyd Parker, Jr. (the founder of the S.H.A.P.E. Community Centre)  became friends with Ponchai while he was on death row.

On 21 February 2000, Wilkerson and fellow death row inmate Howard Guidry took guard Jeanette Bledsoe hostage at the Terrell Unit (now Allan B. Polunsky Unit) outside Livingston, Texas after Wilkerson apparently opened his cell door's lock. Members of the National Black United Front and the S.H.A.P.E. Centre demanded that Wilkerson release the hostage. Thirteen hours later, the guard was released unharmed.

On the day of his execution, Wilkerson refused to leave his cell at the Terrell Unit prison near Livingston, Texas. Guards were forced to use Mace-like gas and carry him to and from the death van that took him to the Hunstville Unit. He did not request a last supper or give any instructions on the disposal of his body. When asked by the warden if he had a last statement, he responded "This is not a capital punishment case!"

After the drugs were administered, Wilkerson spit out an inch-and-a-half universal handcuff and leg restraint key. It was unknown how Wilkerson obtained the key. Wilkerson was pronounced dead at 6:24 p.m.

See also
 Capital punishment in Texas
 Capital punishment in the United States
 List of people executed in Texas, 2000–2009
 List of people executed in the United States in 2000

References

Clark County Prosecutor

1971 births
2000 deaths
American people of Thai descent
American people executed for murder
People from Houston
Executed people from Texas
20th-century executions by Texas
People executed by Texas by lethal injection
People convicted of murder by Texas
Executed African-American people
20th-century executions of American people
20th-century African-American people